Bill Bradshaw is a former American college athletics administrator. He served as athletic director at La Salle University from 1978 to 1986, DePaul University from 1986 to 2002, Temple University from 2002 to 2013, and again at La Salle University from 2016 to 2019. Bradshaw attended college at La Salle University, where he played on the school's baseball team. Bradshaw was named interim athletic director at La Salle on March 9, 2016, before being named permanent athletic director on March 28, 2017. Bradshaw retired as athletic director at La Salle on June 30, 2019.

Head coaching record

References

External links
 La Salle profile

Living people
DePaul Blue Demons athletic directors
La Salle Explorers athletic directors
La Salle Explorers baseball players
Temple Owls athletic directors
Niagara Purple Eagles baseball coaches
Year of birth missing (living people)